The 1872 United States presidential election in Maryland took place on November 5, 1872. All contemporary 37 states were part of the 1872 United States presidential election. The state voters chose eight electors to the Electoral College, which selected the president and vice president.

Maryland was won by the Liberal Republican and Democratic nominees, former Congressman Horace Greeley of New York and his running mate former Senator and Governor Benjamin Gratz Brown of Missouri. Greely and Brown defeated the Republican nominees, incumbent President Ulysses S. Grant of Illinois and his running mate Senator Henry Wilson of Massachusetts. 

Greeley won the state by a narrow margin of 0.68%. However, he died prior to the Electoral College meeting, allowing for Maryland's eight electors to vote for the candidate of their choice.

Results

Results by county

See also
 United States presidential elections in Maryland
 1872 United States presidential election
 1872 United States elections

Notes

References 

Maryland
1872
Presidential